Holy Cross College is a private, Catholic, co-educational, residential institution of higher education administered by members of the Congregation of Holy Cross in Notre Dame, Indiana. The college was founded by the Holy Cross Brothers in 1966.

History
Holy Cross College was initially established in 1966 by the Mid-West Province of the Brothers of the Holy Cross as a two-year junior college, primarily to educate Holy Cross Brothers. Lay male students from the surrounding area started enrolling in 1967 and the college became coeducational in the fall of 1968. The first president and dean was John Driscoll, C.S.C. Originally, Holy Cross College only offered a two year degree, and students would then go on to top tier institutions like Notre Dame, Purdue, or Princeton. Over time, Holy Cross College increased its enrollment and academic offerings, and started to offer four year bachelor degree and many students would complete their education there and the institution became a destination in its own right. In 2013, the College received a record donation of $2 million dollars from Guy Gundlach and the Elkhart County Community Foundation, aimed at providing scholarships to family and spouses of fallen veterans. David Tyson became president in 2017 and set to repair the school's finances and reorganize the school. Due to a land sale to the University of Notre Dame and a reorganization of the curriculum, the College saw its financial situation improve and its enrollment increase. Under his direction, the school reinstated the two-year program aimed at students wishing to transfer to other schools like Notre Dame, as well as a three-year program for highly motivated students, in addition to new faculty hires. In 2020, it received a $1 million grant from the Lilly Endowment Inc. through the Charting the Future of Indiana’s Colleges and Universities program.

Academics
The college's baccalaureate program focuses on experiential learning, founded upon a program of Four Pillars: Service Learning, Global Perspectives, Professional Internship, Classroom Experience which culminates in a Capstone Presentation. Each student completes the same multidisciplinary core courses. Electives may be taken which allows each student to gain knowledge and experience preferred areas of interest. Students have academic advisors for each major and minor they are pursuing. Students may take courses at any of the local universities participating in the Northern Indiana Consortium for Education (NICE). After amassing 30 credit hours (typically after the first year of studies), students may take classes at the University of Notre Dame at no extra cost, provided they maintain at least a 3.0 grade point average.

Current accreditation at the Baccalaureate level includes ten Bachelor of Arts degrees and 17 minors. As of 2018, Business, Psychology, and Communications were the most popular major, although History and Liberal Arts have received favorable reviews. The student-faculty ratio is 12:1, and the 93.4% of classes have fewer than 20 students.

Rankings 
For 2022, was ranked 23rd in Regional Colleges Midwest, 27th in Best Value Schools, and 13th in Top Performers on Social Mobility by U.S. News & World Report.

Student life
Students take part in the about 500 student clubs and organizations across the tri-campus community (including Notre Dame and Saint Mary's). The college's intramural sports, include flag football, volleyball, basketball, and pickleball. Holy Cross hosts its Student Government, which is composed of the Executive Board, the Programming Board, and the Student Senate. The Social Concerns Committee plays an important role in the student's body volunteering and social service causes. Holy Cross students can be members of the University of Notre Dame Marching Band.

Campus ministry is described as "Distinctively Catholic, Open to All" Mass is offered on weekdays at 12:25 p.m. and Sundays at 7:30 p.m. Adoration takes place on Tuesday nights from 7:00 p.m. until midnight. Confession is offered during the first hour of adoration on Tuesdays, along with before and after mass on Fridays.

Mission Team
The Mission Team is a faith development program. This team forms a critical mass of faith-filled students who contribute dynamic leadership and vitality to the school.  They act as a catalyst for stirring up the interest and spiritual yearnings of the rest of the college.

Housing
Holy Cross has six residence halls for students: four male residence halls and two female residence halls. The six residence halls are: Anselm, Basil, James, North, Pulte, and South. Anselm Hall and Basil Hall are traditional male dorms, James Hall and North Hall are traditional female dorms, and Pulte Hall and South hall are apartment-style male dorms.

In addition to the residence halls on campus, upperclassmen are allowed to live off-campus in a co-ed apartment complex called University Edge, located roughly one mile north of Holy Cross.

Athletics
The Holy Cross (HCC) athletic teams are called the Saints. The college is a member of the National Association of Intercollegiate Athletics (NAIA), primarily competing in the Chicagoland Collegiate Athletic Conference (CCAC) since the 2009–10 academic year. The Saints previously competed as an NAIA Independent within the Association of Independent Institutions (AII) from 2006–07 to 2008–09.

HCC competes in eight intercollegiate varsity sports: Men's sports include basketball, golf, soccer and tennis; while women's sports include basketball, golf, soccer and tennis.

The HCC men's lacrosse team competed in the Great Lakes Lacrosse League (GLLL). Basketball games are covered by the Regional Radio Sports Network. Bob Schermerhorn coached the basketball team for three seasons and led the team to 32 wins and their first CCAC post-season tournament victory in 2012 before retiring the following year

Intramural sports
Holy Cross offers students the opportunity to play intramural sports, including flag football, basketball, indoor volleyball, and ultimate frisbee.  Additionally, kickball, dodgeball, and sand volleyball tournaments are held throughout the year. Holy Cross students are also eligible to try out for Club Sports teams at the University of Notre Dame.

Additionally, students, faculty, and staff members at Holy Cross or Saint Mary's College may participate in Notre Dame's Bookstore Basketball Tournament, the largest 5-on-5 tournament in the country held every spring.  In 2012, a team from Holy Cross won the championship, a feat that had never before been accomplished. This same team then defended their title, winning the championship in 2013 and 2014 as well.

International experience
Holy Cross College requires all Bachelor of Arts students to go on a global immersion experience and costs are covered by tuition. There are three primary locations:
Uganda
Peru
India

Alternative programs for psychology students are available in the form of an international psychology conference, while theology students may opt to travel to Rome, Italy as part of a course entitled "Rome Through The Ages".

Additionally, the Campus Ministry department, in conjunction with the University of Notre Dame, offers a pilgrimage to Montreal, Canada, each fall break to visit the St. Joseph Oratory.  Many miracles have occurred at this famous shrine established through the efforts of Holy Cross Brother St. André Bessette, the first saint of the Congregation of Holy Cross and patron of Holy Cross College.

List of Presidents 

 John Driscoll, C.S.C., (1966 – 1987)
 James Leik, C.S.C., (1987 – 1988) (acting)
 David Naples, C.S.C., (1988 – 1990)
 Raphael Wilson, C.S.C., (1990 – 1992) (acting)
 Richard Gilman, C.S.C., (1992 – 2010)
 John Paige, C.S.C., (2011 – 2017)
 David Tyson, C.S.C. (2017–2022)
 Dr. Marco J. Clark, Ed.D. (2022–present)

Notable alumni

Skip Holtz ’84 - Son of Lou Holtz. Coach of the Louisiana Tech Football Team.
Jeffrey Smoke- 2004 U.S. Olympic Kayak racer and two-time gold medalist in the Pan American Games.
Rudy Ruettiger - Football player for University of Notre Dame. His life story inspired the movie Rudy.
Timothy J. DeGeeter - Member of the Ohio House of Representatives and mayor of Parma, Ohio
Tim Fitzpatrick - Actor, Just Married, Just for Kicks, Big Fat Liar.
William Albert Wack - bishop of the Diocese of Pensacola–Tallahassee
Philip Metres - writer (poet, translator, scholar, and essayist
Joseph Fischer -  member of the Kentucky House of Representatives
Son Jong-hyun - South Korean footballer who last played as a midfielder for Louisville City
Wayne Healy, Marty Lloyd, Jim Bonaccorsi - members of the Freddy Jones Band

References

External links
 Official website
 Official athletics website
 Official University Edge website

Holy Cross universities and colleges
Catholic universities and colleges in Indiana
Liberal arts colleges in Indiana
Notre Dame, Indiana
Education in St. Joseph County, Indiana
Buildings and structures in St. Joseph County, Indiana
Educational institutions established in 1966
1966 establishments in Indiana
Association of Catholic Colleges and Universities
Roman Catholic Diocese of Fort Wayne–South Bend
Chicagoland Collegiate Athletic Conference